Robert Gregg Cherry (October 17, 1891June 25, 1957) was the 61st governor of the U.S. state of North Carolina from 1945 to 1949.

Biography
Born in York County, South Carolina near Rock Hill, Cherry grew up in Gastonia, North Carolina with relatives after the death of his parents. He earned bachelor's and law degrees at Trinity College (now Duke University). He organized and led a volunteer artillery company during World War I.

Cherry served as mayor of Gastonia, as a member and speaker of the North Carolina House of Representatives, as chairman of the North Carolina Democratic Party (1937–1940), and as a member of the North Carolina Senate. In Gastonia, it was joked that he was the best lawyer in town when sober, and the second-best lawyer in town when drunk.

In 1944, Cherry was elected governor as the last in a series of governors affiliated with the political machine of former governor O. Max Gardner. He was sworn-in on January 4, 1945. Cherry inherited an economy facing material and labor shortages as a result of the ongoing Second World War. One of his primary focuses during his term was the improvement of mental health care at state-run facilities. Cherry Hospital in Goldsboro, North Carolina, is named for him.

Unlike most other Southern Democratic governors, Cherry supported Harry S. Truman for re-election in 1948. He was succeeded by W. Kerr Scott on January 6, 1949. He retired from politics and returned to the practice of law.

References

Works cited

External links
 
 OurCampaigns.com biography
 National Governors Association biography
 North Carolina Historical Marker 

|-

|-

1891 births
1957 deaths
Duke University Trinity College of Arts and Sciences alumni
Democratic Party governors of North Carolina
North Carolina Democratic Party chairs
North Carolina lawyers
Democratic Party North Carolina state senators
People from Gastonia, North Carolina
Speakers of the North Carolina House of Representatives
Democratic Party members of the North Carolina House of Representatives
20th-century American politicians
20th-century American lawyers